Michael Rieser (5 September 1828, in Schlitters – 9 November 1905, in Vienna) was an Austrian painter. He studied at the Academy of Fine Arts, Munich from 1848 to 1850 under Christian Ruben. After a stay in Rome (1861-1864) he moved to Vienna, and taught at the Kunstgewerbeschule there from 1868 to 1888. His students included Gustav Klimt and Franz von Matsch.

Further reading

External links 
 
 Michael Rieser on artnet

19th-century Austrian painters
19th-century Austrian male artists
Austrian male painters
20th-century Austrian painters
1828 births
1905 deaths
20th-century Austrian male artists